The Frankfurt–Hanau railway was opened in 1848 and was one of the oldest railways in Germany. Today it is a double track electrified main line and part of the North Main Railway from Frankfurt am Main to Hanau.

History

Planning 

The Frankfurt-Hanau Railway Company (FHE) was founded at the initiative of the Prussian consul general to the Free City of Frankfurt, Moritz von Bethmann and with the financial support of the Gebrüder Bethmann bank of Frankfurt and the Bernus du Fay bank of Hanau. On 12 April 1843, the company received a preliminary construction permit from the Electorate of Hesse (Kurhessen), which was converted into a concession in 1844. The concession allowed for the compulsory purchase of the land required. Most of the line ran over the territory of the Electorate of Hesse, only the western section and the Frankfurt terminus, called Hanauer Bahnhof (Hanau Station) were located on the territory of the Free City of Frankfurt. Both the Electorate of Hesse and the Free City of Frankfurt were then independent states, separated by a customs boundary.

The line ran from Hanau station in Frankfurt to its station in Hanau, now called Hanau West station. The original 16.4 km long track is located on the right, northern bank of the Main and was designed by the engineer Peter Johann Wilhelm Zobel. The construction of the railway began in October 1845 in the district of Dörnigheim. There were no significant topographic obstacles to the line. It had only two – elongated – curves through Fechenheimer Mainbogen and at the entry to the spa at Wilhelmsbad. A significant bridge was only required over the Kinzig, just outside the original Hanau station. The stations along the route were equipped to allow trains to pass if necessary.

There was opposition to building the line in Dörnigheim, where the village was divided from part of its fields by the railway, but did not receive a station. Initially, only one track was laid, but the line was prepared for two tracks. The line served traffic between the emerging industrial city of Hanau and its important market in Frankfurt. Since the 17th century there had been regular transport by river boat to market along the Main; this was abandoned after the opening of the railway.

Establishment and revolution
The line was opened for normal services on 10 September 1848 and used on the first day by 15,000 people, which led to chaotic scenes. On the day before the opening a run had been held for invited guests, including members of the Frankfurt Parliament and other celebrities, including the revolutionary, August Schärttner. The Hanau station was decorated with then radical black, red and gold flag. A week after the opening the railway was affected by revolutionary events: a vote of the National Assembly on 16 September 1848 reversed its original rejection of the Treaty of Malmö on Schleswig-Holstein, leading to an attempted revolt of radical forces in Frankfurt. To prevent the arrival of radicals from Hanau by train, Prussian troops dismantled the line at Mainkur.

Connection to rail network
On 22 July 1854, the line was extended by the FHE for 8.9 km to the Bavarian border and the subsequent section of the Ludwig's Western Railway to Aschaffenburg was leased by the FHE from the Royal Bavarian State Railways. Before the building of the line there was a government crisis in Hesse in 1852, because Elector Frederick William expected a bribe of 100,000 thalers from the Bernus du Fay bank before he would sign the appropriate license for the extension of the railway towards Aschaffenburg. The Chief Minister, Ludwig Hassenpflug, offered his resignation, but the elector refused to accept it.

On 31 January 1859 the FHE took over operations of Frankfurt City Link Line, which was opened at that time, connecting the Hanau station in Frankfurt, at the eastern rim of the city, with the Frankfurt western stations. The FHE was thus linked for the first time to the other Frankfurt railways.

The Hessian Ludwig Railway (Hessische Ludwigs-Eisenbahn-Gesellschaft, HLB), which was established in the Grand Duchy of Hesse recognized the importance of the HLB for the expansion of railway services in the Rhine-Main region, particularly to the province of Upper Hesse (an exclave of the Grand Duchy), from the Rhine-Main area to Bavaria and via the Kinzig valley to Bebra. Therefore, from 1862, the HLB tried to acquire the FHE. A merger failed due to opposition from the Kurhessen government, which was planning the construction of the Frankfurt–Bebra railway, which initially used the Frankfurt-Hanau Railway's line to reach Frankfurt. The HLB took over the management only of the FHE from 1 January 1863 to 31 December 1872. After the annexation of Kurhessen by Prussia after the Austro-Prussian War of 1866, the FHE was taken over by the HLB in 1872.

The Frankfurt–Bebra railway was completed from Bebra to Hanuau 1868 and in 1873, it was extended on the south bank line to the Bebra station in Frankfurt, now called Frankfurt South station. The new line involved crossing the Frankfurt–Hanau railway at a junction about a kilometre east of the edge of Hanau's built-up area at the time. The location of the junction was determined by the location of the bridge over the Main at Steinheim. Hanau East station (now Hanau Hauptbahnhof) was built at the junction.

On 1 February 1897 the line of the former FHE was taken over by the Prussian state railways along with the rest of the HLB.
On 1 April 1913 the line was extended by 2.38 km from the new East station via the Deutschherrn bridge over the Main to Frankfurt South. Since then the distance between Frankfurt South and Hanau Hauptbahnhof has been 19.880 km. In 1961, electric trains began running on the line.

Route

The route starts today in the Frankfurt South station, with it platforms on the southern side of the station. It climbs a ramp on to a bridge over the tracks of the Frankfurt-Bebra Railway and then crosses the Main and the Hanauer Landstraße on Deutschherrn bridge.

Hanau station (Frankfurt)

The Hanau station in Frankfurt was a three track terminus, with outer platforms for incoming and outgoing trains, and a central track to allow locomotives to reach the other end of trains. There were also train parking facilities and the depot of the FHE. The original Hanau station was replaced in 1913 by the current through East Station. The new station was built to the southeast of the old station to allow the line to curve on to Deutschherrn bridge. The old station was dismantled and no traces of it are left.

Mainkur station 

The name of the station is derived from an inn located here and was chosen because the neighboring villages of Fechenheim and Enkheim could not agree on a name. Until the annexation of both the Free City of Frankfurt and the Electorate of Hesse by Prussia at the end of the Austro-Prussian War in 1866, Mainkur (now Frankfurt-Mainkur) station was the border station between the two states and handled customs clearance.

The buildings date from 1913–1918. The station is located on the edge of Fechenheim. Therefore, the proposed North Main S-Bahn will have a new Fechenheim station to replace Mainkur station, which would lie about a kilometre to the west.

Bischofsheim-Rumpenheim/Maintal West

The station was originally named Rumpenheim station and was later renamed Bischofsheim-Rumpenheim. The village of Rumpenheim is located south of the Main river and was only accessible from the station by ferry. It is now part of Offenbach am Main. The station was named after Rumpenheim because it had a castle that was the residence of a Landgrave of Hesse, then a branch of the Kurhessen ruling house. It is now called Maintal West station and serves the town of Maintal. The station only consists of two platforms beside each line of the double track.

Hochstadt-Dörnigheim/Maintal Ost

Hochstadt Dörnigheim station was not an original station, but was opened before 1858. In 1858 it was called Hochstadt, but by 1897 it was called Hochstadt-Dörnigheim. It is now called Maintal Ost and also serves the town of Maintal. The station has three tracks at two platforms. The third track is often used during delays for take over of long-distance trains over slower regional trains.

Wilhelmsbad station 

The station building of Hanau-Wilhelmsbad station is one of the oldest of its kind in Hesse and was opened with the line in 1848. Its architect was Julius Eugen Ruhl. The building has been sold and is now used as a restaurant. It forms an architectural ensemble with the neighboring former spa establishment of Wilhelmsbad, built in the late 18th century. It is now called Hanau-Wilhelmsbad. The station consists of two platforms beside each line of the double track.

Hanau West

The original terminus of the line was in the western part of present-day Hanau West station, north-west of Philippsruher Allee. The entrance building was on the eastern side of the line, close to central Hanau. In the 1960s an underpass was constructed creating the current bridge over Philippsruher Allee which also supports the double track with one platform in the centre. During this remodelling the original entrance building designed by Julius Eugen Ruhl was demolished.

Hanau Hauptbahnhof

This was originally built between 1867 and 1873 to the east of Hanau as Hanau East station and later renamed Hanau Hauptbahnhof (Central station). The original entrance building was demolished in 1966 and rebuilt on a larger scale.

Current situation

The track is now double track, electrified and is used by long-distance trains between Frankfurt am Main and Munich. It is also used by freight trains and both mainline and local passenger services. In the area around Frankfurt East station is located – since the demolition of the central Frankfurt freight yard – the largest freight yard in Frankfurt, which includes a container depot.

Planning

The construction of the North Main S-Bahn is planned along the Frankfurt-Hanau line which will add another two tracks south of the existing ones. Some overpasses that have been built in recent years and all the planned works are therefore designed for four tracks.

References

External links
Construction work information of Deutsche Bahn 

Railway lines in Hesse
Railway lines opened in 1848
Standard gauge railways in Germany
Buildings and structures in Frankfurt
Buildings and structures in Main-Kinzig-Kreis